Tinagma californicum is a moth in the Douglasiidae family. It is found in North America, where it has been recorded from California and Washington.

References

Moths described in 1990
Douglasiidae